Darrud (also Romanized as Darrūd and Dar Rūd) is a city in Central District, in Zeberkhan County, Razavi Khorasan Province, Iran. At the 2006 census, its population was 4,979, in 1,431 families.

References 

Populated places in Nishapur County
Cities in Razavi Khorasan Province